Lycée Corneille is a senior high school/sixth form college located in La Celle-Saint-Cloud, Yvelines, France, in the Paris metropolitan area.

The school includes an international Anglophone section and various European sections.

References

External links
 Lycée Corneille 

Lycées in Yvelines